The Guayllabamba is a river that originates in the east of Pichincha in northern Ecuador and flows into the Esmeraldas River. The river is named after the Guayllabamba plain.

Rivers of Ecuador